The demographics of San Marino include population density, ethnicity, education level, economic status, religious affiliations and other aspects of the population.

The population of San Marino consists of native Sammarinese and Italian citizens. Crop farming, sheep farming, and the working of stone from the quarries formed the early backbone of San Marino's economy. It has no mineral resources, and today most of the land is cultivated or covered by woods.

Vital statistics
Sources:

Current vital statistics

CIA World Factbook demographic statistics

Age structure
0-14 years:
16% (male 2,181; female 2,038)
15-64 years:
68% (male 8,992; female 9,425)
65 years and over:
16% (male 1,849; female 2,452) (2000 est.)

Sex ratio
at birth:
1 male(s)/female
under 15 years:
1.07 male(s)/female
15-64 years:
0.95 male(s)/female
65 years and over:
0.75 male(s)/female
total population:
0.94 male(s)/female (2000 est.)

Nationality
noun:
English: Sammarinese (singular and plural); Italian: Sammarinese (singular), Sammarinesi (plural) 
adjective:
Sammarinese

Ethnic groups
Sammarinese, Italian

Religions

Roman Catholic 97.2%

Languages
Italian (official), Sammarinese variety of Romagnol (not official)

Literacy
definition: age 10 and over who can read and write
total population:
96%
male:
97%
female:
95% (1976 est.)

References 

 
Society of San Marino